The Olympic Green Hockey Field was one of nine temporary venues used for the 2008 Summer Olympics. It hosted the field hockey competitions during the Olympics and the football-5-a-side and 7-a-side events during the 2008 Summer Paralympics.

It covered an area of 11.87 hectares with 2 pitches and could seat 17,002 fans. It became the home of China men's and women's national field hockey teams.

It was torn down to make room for the Beijing National Speed Skating Oval.

References
Beijing2008.cn profile.

Venues of the 2008 Summer Olympics
Defunct sports venues in China
Olympic field hockey venues